Live at Park Ave. is a live album by the Gaslight Anthem. It was recorded on October 22, 2008, and released exclusively on vinyl on April 19, 2009.
This live EP consists of 6 songs, recorded live at the Think Indie store, Park Ave CDs, in Orlando, Florida, during the band's tour with Rise Against, Thrice and Alkaline Trio. The last song played, "Once Upon a Time", is a cover of Robert Bradley's Blackwater Surprise, previously released as an iTunes bonus track on the band's successful album The '59 Sound.

Track listing

References

External links
ThinkIndie.com

The Gaslight Anthem albums
2009 live albums
2009 EPs
Live EPs
Record Store Day releases
SideOneDummy Records albums